Pterigynandrum filiforme is a species of moss belonging to the family Pterigynandraceae.

It has cosmopolitan distribution.

References

Hypnales